Karl Joel may refer to:

 Karl Joel (philosopher) (1864–1934), German philosopher
 Karl Amson Joel (1889–1982), German-Jewish textile merchant and manufacturer